The Changbai Mountains mixed forests ecoregion (WWF ID: PA0414) covers the Changbai Mountains and surrounding foothills in China and North Korea.   The region features extensive and naturally preserved deciduous and conifer forests.  The region exhibits high biodiversity due to its relative isolation, temperate climate with high rainfall, and centrality to central Chinese, Siberian, and European floral communities.  In 1979, a significant portion of the ecoregion was designated the Changbaishan Biosphere Reserve by UNESCO.

Location and description 

The Changbai Mountains area ranges across the foothills and higher elevations of a volcanic plateau on the north of the Korean peninsula, straddling the border between China and North Korea.  The region is surrounded by the lower terrain of the Manchurian mixed forests ecoregion, but is centered on the volcanic crater of Paektu Mountain.

Climate 
The climate of the Changbai ecoregion is Humid continental climate, warm summer (Köppen climate classification (Dwb)), with a dry winter. Annual precipitation is 500 to 1,000 mm at the lower and middle elevations, reaching 1,400 mm at the higher points.

Flora and fauna 
Because the ecoregion includes altitudes from below 1,100 meters to above 2,600 meters, it features different floristic altitude zones.   From the lower altitudes, deciduous trees mixed with conifers characterize the forest up to about the 1,100 meter level.  A "dark conifer" belt runs from 1,100 meters to 1,900 meters, and alpine meadows and bare rock at the higher elevations.

The mixed forests feature Korean pine (Pinus koraiensis), Manchurian fir (Abies holophylla), Manchuran lime (Tilia), and Mongolian oak (Quercus mongolica).  The higher dark conifer forest features Yezo spruce (Picea jezoensis), Khingan fir (Abies nephrolepis), and Olgan larch (Larix olgensis).

See also 
 Ecoregions in China

References 

Ecoregions of China
Ecoregions of North Korea
Palearctic ecoregions
Forests of China
Temperate broadleaf and mixed forests
Montane forests